Chail may refer to:

People 
 Probir Chail (born 1956), Indian cricketer
 Prolay Chail (born 1951), Indian cricketer

Places 
 Chail, Deux-Sèvres, France
 Chail, Himachal Pradesh, India
 Chail, Uttar Pradesh, India
 Chail Assembly constituency
 Chail Lok Sabha constituency

Other uses 
 Chail (meteorite), an 1814 meteorite fall
 Chail, a dialect area of the Torwali language in Pakistan